Bancomat is an Italian interbank network for cash withdrawals widely used in Italy. It was first introduced in 1983 for use with automated teller machines.

The network is owned by the Rome-based Bancomat, S.p.A. and its cards are issued by Italian banks. The service is only used in Italy and the word “bancomat” is used in Italy as a synonym for automated teller machine.

In 1986, an associated debit card network called PagoBancomat was introduced, which is based on the Bancomat service and is intended for PIN-based POS transactions.

Since the Bancomat network is not used outside Italy, almost every Bancomat/PagoBancomat debit card is co-branded with a multinational service, such as Mastercard, Maestro, Visa, Visa Electron or V Pay, for use abroad.

A new service called Bancomat Pay was introduced in January 2019. It is intended for electronic payment for online transactions.

See also 

 ATM card
 Point of sale

References

External links
Bancomat

Interbank networks
Debit cards
Mobile payments
1983 establishments in Italy